Roossenekal is a town in Elias Motsoaledi Local Municipality in the Limpopo province of South Africa.

Village on the western slopes of the Steenkampsberg, 95 km north-east of Middelburg. It was proclaimed in January 1886 and named after two soldiers who died in the war against Mapoch's tribe - Stefanus Johannes Roos, Field-Cornet of the Potchefstroom commando, and Frederick Senekal, Commandant of the Rustenburg commando.

References

Populated places in the Elias Motsoaledi Local Municipality